Väätäinen is a Finnish surname. Notable people with the surname include:

Janne Väätäinen (born 1975), Finnish ski jumper
Juha Väätäinen (born 1941), Finnish long-distance runner and politician
Tuula Väätäinen (born 1955), Finnish politician

Finnish-language surnames